Isa Kand (also Romanized as ‘Īsá Kand; also known as ‘Īsá Kandī) is a village in Akhtachi-ye Gharbi Rural District, in the Central District of Mahabad County, West Azerbaijan Province, Iran. At the 2006 census, its population was 389, in 63 families.

References 

Populated places in Mahabad County